Myles Cameron Baldwin (born 6 October 1978) is an Australian horticulturalist, landscape designer, writer and curator of the Australian Garden Show Sydney. He was named as one of "Australia's top 100 young leaders" by The Australian in 2009, and in 2010 was the Horticultural Ambassador for Macquarie Visions. Baldwin has worked on Sydney's largest private garden, Swifts, Darling Point, and Government House, Sydney.

Early life
Baldwin was born in Sydney and grew up in Sylvania. He was educated at Newington College (1991–1996).

Career

Baldwin worked as an horticultural apprentice at the Royal Botanic Gardens, Sydney where he received the Director's Award for Excellence and Achievement. He then assumed the role as head gardener at the heritage property Bronte House, a c1845 Mortimer Lewis cottage in the Sydney suburb of Bronte, New South Wales. Baldwin is director of Myles Baldwin Design Pty Ltd, and has been responsible for designing the period gardens at Boomerang in Elizabeth Bay, the John Verge mansion Lyndhurst in Glebe, heritage-listed home Rona at Bellevue Hill, New South Wales and The Speakers Garden  in Parliament House, Sydney. He has also worked with many of Australia's leading architects on contemporary properties throughout Australia.

Media presenter
Baldwin has appeared on the Today show and Brendan Moar's Gardening Show on Foxtel and was a presenter on Our Place TCN9 and has been the gardening columnist for Sydney's Sunday Herald.

Publications
 Period gardens: landscapes for houses with history by Myles Baldwin with photography by Simon Griffiths (Sydney : Murdoch Books, 2008)
 Rural Australian gardens by Myles Baldwin with photography by Simon Griffiths (Sydney : Murdoch Books, 2010)
 Australian Coastal Gardens by Myles Baldwin with photography by Sue Stubbs (Sydney  : Murdoch Books, 2013)

References

1978 births
Living people
Australian artisans
Australian environmentalists
Australian gardeners
Australian horticulturists
Australian non-fiction writers
Australian television presenters
Australian landscape or garden designers
People educated at Newington College
Writers from Sydney